Bloxham Village Museum is a local museum located in the village of Bloxham in Oxfordshire, England.

Overview
The museum was established in 1980.

The museum is in the old court house and fire station in a corner of St Mary's churchyard. The building was rebuilt in the 1680s and retains some 14th-century details.

This small, volunteer-run museum reflects past life in the ancient and beautiful village of Bloxham with a different themed exhibition each year.  The museum is open from Easter until October.

See also
 List of museums in Oxfordshire
 Museum of Oxford

References

Bibliography

External links

Bloxham Village Museum

1980 establishments in England
Museums established in 1980
Local museums in Oxfordshire
Former courthouses in England
Cherwell District